Vella Lavella is an island in the Western Province of the Solomon Islands. It lies to the west of New Georgia, but is considered one of the New Georgia Group. To its west are the Treasury Islands.

Environment
The island of Vella Lavella is located in the southwestern Pacific Ocean. To the north is the island of Choiseul, to the northwest is the island of Shortland, and to the southeast is the island of New Georgia. Vella Lavella is a volcanic island, surrounded in some places by a coral reef. The island contains volcanic cones and one thermal spring. The volcano Nonda (the youngest volcano of the island),  has an elevation of 750 meters and is considered active, although it has never erupted in modern times. The smaller rivers running from the mountains to the coast allow irrigated horticulture to the inhabitants who live almost exclusively on the coast. Vella Lavella is mainly vegetated with lowland rainforest. The climate is wet and tropical, and the island is prone to earthquakes and cyclones.

North-west Vella Lavella Important Bird Area
An area of 14,641 ha in the north-west of the island has been identified by BirdLife International as an Important Bird Area (IBA) because it supports populations of white-winged fantails, Kolombangara monarchs and endemic Vella Lavella white-eyes. The main threat facing the site is logging.

History
Painted potshards found during excavations date back to an age of 2,000 to 3,000 years.

The Bilua language spoken on the island belongs to the Papuan languages, while the other languages of the Solomon Islands belong to the Austronesian languages. Therefore, archaeologists suspect the immigration of a people who did not come from the Melanesian settlement area.

On March 15, 1893 Vella Lavella was declared part of the British Solomon Islands protectorate.

The island was occupied by the Empire of Japan in the early stages of the Pacific War.  The Land Battle of Vella Lavella was fought between Allied and Japanese forces from 15 August – 6 October 1943. After a landing at Barakoma on 15 August, US troops advanced along the coasts, pushing the Japanese north. In September, New Zealand troops took over from the Americans and they continued to advance across the island, hemming the small Japanese garrison consisting of  250 Japanese personnel, who were a mix of soldiers evacuated from New Georgia and sailors who had been stranded on the island, along the north coast. On 6 October, the Japanese began an evacuation operation to withdraw the remaining troops, during which the Naval Battle of Vella Lavella was fought. Following the capture of the island, the Allies developed it into an important airbase which was used in the reduction of main Japanese base at Rabaul. Subsequently, Barakoma Airfield on Vella Lavella was the home base for VMF-214 (the "Black Sheep," led by Gregory Boyington).

Since 1978, the island has been part of the independent state of the Solomon Islands.

Notable local people
 Milna Tozaka was elected to the National Parliament of the Solomon Islands to represent the North Vella Lavella Constituency on 5 April 2006. He is the current Foreign Minister in the cabinet of Prime Minister Rick Douglas Hou; he has previously served as the Minister for Public Service.

Notes
Footnotes

References

Gallery

External links
  overhead images show what may be the remains of the Marines' airfield.

Islands of the Solomon Islands
Important Bird Areas of the Solomon Islands
Western Province (Solomon Islands)